Henry Baker Tristram FRS (11 May 1822 – 8 March 1906) was an English clergyman, Bible scholar, traveller and ornithologist. As a parson-naturalist he was an early supporter of Darwinism, attempting to reconcile evolution and creation.

Biography
He was the son of the Rev. Henry Baker Tristram, born at Eglingham vicarage, near Alnwick, Northumberland. He studied at Durham School and Lincoln College, Oxford. In 1846 he was ordained a priest.

Diplomatic, scientific and  missionary work
Tristram was secretary to the governor of Bermuda from 1847 to 1849. He explored the Sahara desert, and in 1858 visited Palestine, returning there in 1863 and 1872, and dividing his time between natural history observations and identifying localities mentioned in the Old and New Testaments. In 1873 he became canon of Durham Cathedral. In 1881 he travelled again to Palestine, the Lebanon, Mesopotamia, and Armenia. He also made a voyage to Japan to visit his daughter, Katherine Alice Salvin Tristram, who was a missionary and teacher in Osaka.

In 1858, he read the simultaneously-published papers by Charles Darwin and Alfred Russel Wallace that were read in the Linnean Society, and published a paper in Ibis stating that given the "series of about 100 Larks of various species before me... I cannot help feeling convinced of the views set forth by Messrs Darwin and Wallace." He attempted to reconcile this early acceptance of evolution with creation. Following the famous Oxford Debate between Thomas Henry Huxley and Samuel Wilberforce, Tristram, after early acceptance of the theory, rejected Darwinism.

Tristram was a founder and original member of the British Ornithologists' Union, and appointed a fellow of the Royal Society in 1868. Edward Bartlett, an English ornithologist and son of Abraham Dee Bartlett, accompanied Tristram to Palestine in 1863–1864. During his travels he accumulated an extensive collection of bird skins, which he sold to the World Museum Liverpool.

Published works
Tristram's publications included
 The Great Sahara (1860)
The Land of Israel, a Journal of Travels in Palestine, Undertaken with Special Reference to Its Physical Character (1865)
The Natural History of the Bible (1867); 10th edition (1911)
Scenes in the East (1870)
The Daughters of Syria (1872)
Land of Moab (1874)
Pathways of Palestine (1882)
The Fauna and Flora of Palestine (1884)
 The Survey of Western Palestine: The Fauna and Flora of Palestine (1884)
Eastern Customs in Bible Lands (1894) and Rambles in Japan (1895)

Legacy
A number of birds were named after him, including Tristram's starling (also called Tristram's grackle), Tristram's warbler, Tristram's woodpecker, Tristram's serin, and Tristram's storm-petrel. He also lent his name to the gerbil Meriones tristrami  (also called Tristram's jird). He is also commemorated in the scientific name of a species of lizard, Acanthodactylus tristrami.

References

External links

 1865:  The land of Israel: Travels in Palestine.
 1873: The land of Moab; travels and discoveries on the east side of the Dead Sea and the Jordan
 

1822 births
1906 deaths
19th-century English Anglican priests
Alumni of Lincoln College, Oxford
English ornithologists
English travel writers
Fellows of the Royal Society
Holy Land travellers
Palestinologists
Parson-naturalists
People educated at Durham School
People from Alnwick
Theistic evolutionists
Zoological collectors
Natural history of Palestine (region)